Shoreham-by-Sea railway station serves the town of Shoreham-by-Sea in the county of West Sussex, and also serves the nearby Shoreham Airport. The station and the majority of trains serving it are operated by Govia Thameslink Railway, primarily under its Southern brand, but also as Thameslink.

It is  down the line from Brighton. Both platforms can handle trains with up to 12 coaches.

History
The original Shoreham station was a terminus built by the London & Brighton Railway and was opened on 11 May 1840. The original building was demolished in 1845 when the Brighton and Chichester Railway opened its line to Worthing railway station. Both railways merged with others in July 1846 to become the London, Brighton & South Coast Railway.

Facilities 
The station has a staffed ticket office which is open for the majority of the day on all days as well as self-service ticket machines available. The station also has a passenger waiting room, café and toilets which are open when the station is staffed.

Both platforms and the waiting room have departure boards as well as modern help points and are both fully accessible with step-free access available throughout the station.

The station has a large chargeable car park at its entrance as well as a large bicycle storage facility.

Services
Off-peak, all services at Shoreham-by-Sea are operated by Southern using  EMUs.

The typical off-peak service in trains per hour is:
 2 tph to  via 
 2 tph to 
 2 tph to 
 1 tph to 
 1 tph to 

During the peak hours, the station is served by a small number of direct trains between Brighton and Littlehampton.

Until May 2022, Great Western Railway operated limited services between Brighton, Portsmouth Harbour and Bristol Temple Meads that called at Shoreham-by-Sea.

References

External links

Adur District
Former London, Brighton and South Coast Railway stations
Railway stations in Great Britain opened in 1840
Railway stations in West Sussex
DfT Category D stations
Railway stations served by Govia Thameslink Railway
Railway station